The Enstrom F-28 and 280 are a family of small, light piston engine powered helicopters produced by the Enstrom Helicopter Corporation.

Design and development
Since delivering their first helicopter shortly after Federal Aviation Administration type certification of the F-28 model in April 1965, Enstrom helicopter has produced, approximately 1,200 aircraft.

The company produces three models, the F-28, the more aerodynamic 280 and the turbine-powered 480, each with their own variants. The F-28 and 280 both use Lycoming piston engines, virtually identical to those found in general aviation fixed-wing aircraft.

Variants

F-28

F-28
Certified April 1965.
F-28A
Initial production version. Certified May 1968.
T-28
Turbine powered.
F-28B
Turbocharged version.
F-28C
Fitted with an upgraded engine with turbocharger, and a two piece windscreen. Certified 1975
F-28F Falcon
Similar to F-28C with more powerful engine, improved turbocharger and addition of a throttle corellator. Certified December 1980
F-27F-P
Police patrol version developed for the Pasadena Police Department (California). It is equipped with searchlights, FLIR and a public address system.
Spitfire Mark I
A turbine powered conversion by Spitfire Helicopters Inc.
Spitfire Mark II Tigershark
A turbine powered conversion by Spitfire Helicopters Inc.

280

280 Shark
Certified September 1975.
280C Shark
Aerodynamically refined version of the F28C-2, equipped with an upgraded engine, fitted with a turbocharger. Certified 1975
280L Hawk
Stretched cabin four-seat version, first flying in December 1968. Development halted due to lack of funds.
280F
Similar to 280C with more powerful engine, improved turbocharger and addition of a throttle correlator. Certified December 1980
280FX
Based on the 280F with landing gear fairings, redesigned air intakes on top of the cabin and a redesigned and relocated horizontal stabilizer with vertical end plates. Certified in January 1985

Operators

Civil operators
The aircraft is operated by a large number of small commercial and flight training operators, most operating one or two aircraft.

Military and government operators
 

 Chilean Army

Colombian Air Force - 12 F-28F trainers delivered 1994.
 
 Peruvian Air Force
 Peruvian Army
 Peruvian Navy
 
 Pasadena Police Department
 
Venezuelan Air Force

Accidents and incidents
The broadcast captured her shouting "Hit the water! Hit the water! Hit the water!" as the helicopter went down. The pilot survived with serious injuries, but Dornacker died on the way to the hospital.
 On 26 January 2015, an Enstrom 280FX crashed at Erie, Colorado, following the separation of its main rotor blades, killing both the student and instructor on board. The accident was caused by a failure of the main rotor spindle as a result of a crack. The accident resulted in the issuance of an Emergency Airworthiness Directive (AD) by the United States Federal Aviation Administration on 12 February 2015 grounding more than 300 helicopters. The AD requires a magnetic particle inspection to detect cracks in the main rotor spindle in aircraft with more than 5,000 hours and requires replacing the spindle if cracked.

Specifications (F28F)

See also

References

Bibliography
 Federal Aviation Administration Type Certificate No.H1CE

External links

 Enstrom Piston products page
 Enstrom page on The Helicopter History site

Enstrom aircraft
1960s United States civil utility aircraft
1960s United States helicopters
Single-engined piston helicopters
Aircraft first flown in 1965